Brit Awards 2003  was the 23rd edition of the annual Brit Awards pop music awards ceremony in the United Kingdom. It was organised by the British Phonographic Industry and took place on 20 February 2003 at Earls Court in London. British Newcomer and International Newcomer renamed the British Breakthrough Act and International Breakthrough Act. first present year in British Urban Act.

Performances

Winners and nominees

Outstanding Contribution to Music
Tom Jones

Multiple nominations and awards

References

External links
Brit Awards 2003 at Brits.co.uk

Brit Awards
Brit Awards, 2003
Brit Awards, 2003
Brit Awards
Brit
Brit Awards